Chief Frederick Chidozie Ogbalu (1927 — 1990) known predominantly as F. C. Ogbalu was a Nigerian linguist and educator. He is predominantly known for centralising Igbo language and is sometimes called the "father" of Igbo language and culture. In 1949, he founded Society for Promoting Igbo Language and Culture.

References 

Nigerian academics
Igbo people
1927 births
1990 deaths
Igbo novelists
Igbo writers
Igbo-language writers